Purandar may refer to:

 Purandar taluka, a sub-district in Pune, Maharashtra, India
 Purandar fort, a fort in the taluka
 Treaty of Purandar (1665), a treaty ending a battle at the fort